Keri Noble (born 1975) is an American singer-songwriter born in Fort Worth, Texas and raised in Detroit. Her father was a Baptist minister, and Noble sang in church as a child. She attended a local Assembly of God school for Junior High and high school in Michigan.  She began playing her own music in the Detroit area.  After meeting Billy McLaughlin, she moved to Minneapolis, and in 2003 she signed with major label EMI.  She has been compared to Norah Jones. She left EMI in 2005 and signed with JVC in Japan where she achieved great success, enabling her to continue to write and perform in the US without the support of a label.

In 2008 Noble signed with Telarc Records in the United States and released a full-length album (self titled) in February 2009.  In June, she released her EP, "Leave Me in the Dark", and November brought the release of her first-ever holiday cd, "Winter Comes Again", which she produced herself.

Currently, Noble resides in Minneapolis with her cat, Akiko, and her husband, former Minnesota Viking, Mike Morris.  She continues to tour both the U.S. and Japan in support of her albums.

In April 2012 Noble began co-hosting the morning show on KTCZ-FM ("Cities 97") in Minneapolis, MN. After 7 years, she left the show to pursue a career in vocal lessons to fellow singers.

Noble's song "If No One Will Listen" has been covered by Kelly Clarkson and is featured on her album All I Ever Wanted.

Discography 
Albums
2002 Lullaby (Raven)
2005 Fearless (Manhattan)
2007 'Let Go (JVC)
2008 Leave Me in the Dark 
2008 Winter Comes Again2009 Keri Noble (LP, Telarc Records)
2010 When It Don't Come Easy2010 Flying Solo2011 More Than Santa2014 Softer Place To Land2016 Find My Way Home''

Guest Appearances
2002 Son of Adam "Waiting for the Radio"

References

 McLEAN, Robyn. Good fortune smiles on Noble. The Dominion Post via Asia Africa Intelligence Wire. 13 August 2004
 Jones, Vanessa E. Keri Noble. Boston Globe, March 12, 2004
Keri Noble leaves Cities 97.1 morning show to pursue vocal training career

External links 
Official Page 
myspace

1977 births
Living people
American women singer-songwriters
Singer-songwriters from Texas
21st-century American singers
21st-century American women singers